Tanya White (born 22 April 1972) is an Australian taekwondo practitioner, born in Adelaide.

Playing career
She competed at the 2000 Summer Olympics in Sydney. She won a silver medal in heavyweight at the 1996 Asian Taekwondo Championships in Melbourne.

References

External links

1972 births
Living people
Australian female taekwondo practitioners
Olympic taekwondo practitioners of Australia
Taekwondo practitioners at the 2000 Summer Olympics
Asian Taekwondo Championships medalists
20th-century Australian women